André Brunot (3 October 1879 - 6 August 1973) was a French film actor. He appeared in more than twenty films from 1910 to 1966.

Filmography

References

External links
 

1879 births
1973 deaths
French male film actors
20th-century French male actors
Sociétaires of the Comédie-Française
Administrators of the Comédie-Française